Mount Olive is a Church to the east of Stringtown in Atoka County, Oklahoma, United States. 

Geography of Atoka County, Oklahoma
Ghost towns in Oklahoma